The Laluan Penarikan (Malay 'portage route') were a series of portage routes across the Malay Peninsula. The most famous of these routes connected the Muar River with the Pahang River. The Penarikan shortened the journey of water vessels sailing between the Strait of Malacca and the South China Sea.

History
In the ancient times, the rivers Muar and Pahang were nearly connected at a place called Jempol specifically in town of Bahau, in present-day Negeri Sembilan, where the Muar meets the Jempol River. The Serting River, not far from the confluence of the former two, flows into the Bera River, a tributary of the Pahang. The Penarikan allowed trading boats between ports and harbours or places from both sides of the Malay peninsula, like traders from Malacca or Muar could continue their journey along the Muar until they reach Kuala Pahang in Pekan, or Kuala Lipis to continue into Terengganu, Kelantan or Perak.

At the Penarikan, the locals help will be required to pull the boats overland. The distance is about 300 meters and because of the action of pulling of boats overland, the route is named Penarikan, which is the Malay word for pulling.

The Penarikan could have been discovered circa 14th century, way before the days of the Malacca Sultanate. The Arab merchants were actively trading as well as spreading Islam. When Malacca was discovered, they came to Malacca for trade and at the same time; the Pasai came to Malacca too to acquire their daily sundries. Coincidentally, these are the same group of people whom they spread the religion to. The Arabs complained to the Pasai about the trials and tribulations of trading in Siam because of the arduous journey through the Strait of Malacca, then on the Straits of Terbrau before they can continue the voyage through the South China Sea towards their destination in Siam. This voyage which take weeks is extremely lengthy and difficult. After listening to the grouses of the Arab merchants, the Pasai revealed that there was a short cut where they could avoid the arduous voyage.

However, they have to pull their boats off shore for a kilometer or so. Learning of this, the Arabs endeavoured to try out this route. One day, the Pasai show this route to the Arabs. First, they sailed from Malacca along the Muar River to reach  Jempol River, from where they have to pull the boats on shore for a short distance to get into the Serting River. They then continue their journey along the Bera River to arrive at Kuala Bera from which they proceeded to the South China Sea via Pahang River — and finally to their destination in Siam. The Arabs discovered that even though they have to go on land for a part of the journey, it was very much shorter. So from that day onwards, they decided to use this route and the Penarikan became famous ever since.

The Penarikan played a vital role in the military operations between Siam and Malacca. Using this route, the Siamese have launched many attacks against Malacca. A troop was sent to make an ambush. Half of the troop stayed near the Penarikan as backup and the other half attacked Malacca. However, the backup group has another mission, they have to dig a big canal measuring 30 feet by 20 feet in depth, so that they could connect the two rivers, Jempol and Serting River.

A leader of the Siamese army was later buried near the Penarikan. The tombstone was believed to have been transported all the way from Siam. The Siamese leader's grave could still be found near the route, which dates back to 1265.

The Penarikan has also witnessed many significant events in history. The famous Malaccan warrior Hang Tuah, while on the run with Tun Teja, used Penarikan to flee to Pahang. The last Sultan of Malacca, Sultan Mahmud Shah, after the conquest of Malacca by the Portuguese Empire had also used Penarikan to escape to Pahang.

In 1613, a Portuguese officer wrote that he took a boat ride from Muar to Pekan, and the journey took him six days. A map produced in 1598 showed that the Muar River and the Pahang River is connected at a place which is now called Serting in Negeri Sembilan.

The Muar River - Pahang River Penarikan route is a safer route to the South China Sea or to the Straits of Malacca, because there were no disturbances and threats of piracy that reign the seas.

Apart from that there were also signs of trading activities, whereby goods changed hands at this point. These means the boats from Pahang with the produce they carry stopped here, transact and pick up goods that are east bound and return to Pahang. Similarly, boats from Muar, bringing goods from Malacca and Singapore were brought to the Penarikan, where barter trade occurred.

See also
 Spice trade
 Silk Road

Successor cross-peninsular routes
 Malaysia Federal Route 2
 Malaysia Federal Route 4
 Malaysia Federal Route 185
 East Coast Expressway
 MRL East Coast Rail Link

References

Further reading
 N. Rajendra, "Retracing the Penarikan Route", Malaysia in History 12(2), March 1969.
 P. Borschberg, The Singapore and Melaka Straits. Violence, Security and Diplomacy in the 17th Century, Singapore: NUS Press, 2010. 

Ancient roads and tracks
Trade routes
Portages
Medieval Asia
History of Malaysia
Water transport in Malaysia
Ports and harbours of Malaysia
History of Muar
History of Imperial China
History of foreign trade in China
History of international relations
Ancient international relations
International road networks